Raymond G. Squires,  (February 6, 1926 – October 8, 2019) was a Canadian businessman and retired senator.

Born in St. Anthony, Newfoundland and Labrador, he was the owner a gas and automobile service station and a motel. He was a St. Anthony city councilor for twelve years and mayor for eight years.

In June 2000, he was summoned to the Senate of Canada by Adrienne Clarkson on the advice of Jean Chrétien representing the senatorial division of Newfoundland and Labrador. A Liberal, he served until 75th birthday in February 2001.

In 1997, he was made a Member of the Order of Canada for his "lifelong commitment to the social welfare of his fellow citizens through his contributions as a businessman, philanthropist and municipal politician". He died on October 8, 2019.

References

External links
 

1926 births
2019 deaths
Canadian senators from Newfoundland and Labrador
Liberal Party of Canada senators
Mayors of places in Newfoundland and Labrador
Members of the Order of Canada
People from St. Anthony, Newfoundland and Labrador
21st-century Canadian politicians